Abburi Chayadevi (13 October 1933 in Rajahmundry, East Godavari district, Andhra Pradesh – 28 June 2019 in Hyderabad, Telangana) was a Telugu Indian fiction writer. She won the Sahitya Akademi Award in 2005, for her work Tana Margam (Short Stories).

Biography
Chaya Devi was active in literary circles since the fifties and even in her 70s, was still known as a creative feminist writer. She was born in a brahmin family She also translated German fiction. Her stories have been translated into English and Spanish besides many Indian languages.
She served as librarian at the Jawaharlal Nehru University, New Delhi in the sixties.

She was a council member of Kendra Sahitya Akademi (1998-2002).

Chayadevi's husband, Abburi Varadarajeswara Rao, was a writer, critic and former Chairman of the Official Languages Commission.

She was also the daughter-in-law of Abburi Ramakrishna Rao, a pioneer of the romantic first and later the progressive literary movement.

Works 
Anaga Anaga (folk stories for children)
Abburi Chaya Devi Kathalu (short stories), 1991
Mrityunjaya (long story), 1993
Tana Margam (short stories-about the exploitation of women in the guise of family bonds).
Mana Jeevithalu-Jiddu Krishnamurti Vyakhyanalu–3 (Translated)
Parichita Lekha published as an anthology (Translation of stories by Austrian writer Stefan Zweig)
Bonsai Batukulu [Bonsai Lives] portrays the life of women who live mechanically under the control of family members.  Conclusion

Awards 
Ranganayakamma Pratibha Puraskaram,2003
Telugu University Award, 1996
Sahitya Akademi Award in Telugu for the Year 2005

References 

2019 deaths
Telugu women writers
Telugu writers
Recipients of the Sahitya Akademi Award in Telugu
20th-century Indian women writers
20th-century Indian novelists
Writers from Rajahmundry
20th-century Indian short story writers
Indian women children's writers
Indian children's writers
Women writers from Andhra Pradesh
1933 births